Manuel Schenkhuizen, better known as Grubby, is a Dutch real-time strategy gamer and former professional esports player. He competed in the RTS games Warcraft III (WC3), Warcraft III: The Frozen Throne and Starcraft II. Grubby is the most successful WC3 player of all time, as an Orc player, having won more than 38 LAN tournaments, of which six were World Championships. His command over the Horde placed him early enough among the elite of the WC3 players, while his clash with Jang "Spirit Moon" Jae-ho rewarded him with a legendary status among the fans of the game. Grubby has been known for being part of one of the most successful WC3 teams in history, namely the British 4Kings. Later teams include the Danish MeetYourMakers and the North American Evil Geniuses. Grubby is widely regarded as one of the greatest Orc players of all time. Grubby is now a popular full-time streamer on Twitch.

Esports career

Grubby has been on three professional teams throughout his career. His stay in Four-Kings (4K) lasted from October 2003 until January 2008. From January 2008 until January 2009 he featured in MeetYourMakers (MYM). In the past, he has formed strong 2 versus 2 teams with Arvid "Myth" Fekken, Yoan "ToD" Merlo and Olav "Creolophus" Undheim. In 2008, 4K discontinued their Warcraft III team and all the players went their own way. After the disbanding of the team MeetYourMakers in January 2009, Grubby and his then teammate Jang Jae Ho parted ways. He then joined the team Evil Geniuses in April 2009 with his wife Cassandra "PpG" Ng. He left the team in April 2011 and continues to compete solo. His major tournament victories include the World Cyber Games in 2004, Electronic Sports World Cup 2005, the World Series of Video Games in 2006, the World Cyber Games 2008, World e-Sports Masters in 2009 and e-Stars 2009 – King of the Game, Seoul – South Korea

His accomplishments in the two World Cyber Games victories have led him to be included in the tournament's hall of fame. Schenkhuizen is the only WC3 player to have won both the WCG and the ESWC title. He's also one of the longest playing professional players of Warcraft III. Schenkhuizen is the protagonist in the documentary film Beyond the Game.

In 2011, Schenkhuizen moved from Warcraft III to StarCraft II as a Protoss player.

In 2015, he began casting esports events for Heroes of the Storm, including casting the world championships at Blizzcon 2015 and 2016.

Personal life
Schenkhuizen born in a family of Dutch Indo descent. He became engaged to Cassandra 'PpG' Ng at BlizzCon 2009 and the two married in 2010.

Tournament results
 1st Place – WCReplays Almojo $1000 Tournament
 2nd Place – NGTV League Season 1 Aug – Oct 2008
 1st Place – AMD Black All Stars October 2008
 2nd Place – 2on2 Fit4Gaming December 2008
 1st Place – GOMtv World Invitational (GWI) June 2009

Awards

Esports awards
 eSports Team of the Year (2005), with team 4Kings
 Best Warcraft 3 Player (2006)

GosuGamers awards
 Gosu Gamer of the Year (2006)
 Gosu Gamer of the Year (2008)

ESL's WC3L awards
 Electronic Sports League WarCraft 3 League Season 5 Most Valuable Player
 Electronic Sports League WarCraft 3 League Season 7 Most Valuable Player
 Electronic Sports League WarCraft 3 League Season 8 Most Valuable Player
 Electronic Sports League WarCraft 3 League Season 9 Most Valuable Player

Interviews

2013 
 4 January | Written Interview with Cadred by Cadred.org

2012 
 24 September |  by Cadred.org
 3 September |  by BenQ
 10 June |  by TeamLiquid.net
 31 May | Written Interview StarsWars7 Western Qualifiers Winner by s.163.com
 29 May |  by itmeJP
 25 May | Written Interview with Manuel "Grubby" Schenkuizhen by Definitive eSports
 28 March |  by CyberSportsNetwork
 10 January | Written interview with Ayesee by ItsGosu

2011 
 5 December | Audio Interview with Grubby by Team Dignitas
 21 October |  by Noam

References

External links
 Player profile on SK Gaming
 Grubby on Twitch

1986 births
Living people
Dutch esports players
StarCraft players
Warcraft III players
People from Nieuwegein
Dutch people of Indonesian descent
4Kings players
MeetYourMakers players
Evil Geniuses players
Twitch (service) streamers
Sportspeople from Utrecht (province)